Concrete is the ninth studio album by former Guns N' Roses guitarist Izzy Stradlin. The album continues the iTunes-exclusive pattern, and was released in 2008.

Track listing
All lyrics and music by Izzy Stradlin.
"Ball" - 3:06
"Circle" - 3:49
"Easy" - 3:11
"Concrete" - 4:57
"Drove" - 4:04
"Ship" - 2:52
"G.B." - 3:08
"Knuckleheads" - 2:15
"I Know" - 2:52
"Raggadubbacrete" - 5:34

Personnel
Izzy Stradlin - lead vocals, rhythm guitar
Rick Richards - lead guitar
JT Longoria - bass
Taz Bentley - drums

Additional personnel
Duff McKagan - bass on three songs (only confirmed on the title track)

References

2008 albums
Izzy Stradlin albums